The men's 200 metre backstroke event at the 2005 World Aquatics Championships took place between 28 July – 29 July. Both the heats and semifinals were held on 28 July with the heats being held in the morning session and the semifinals being held in the evening session. The final was held on 29 July.

Records
Prior to the competition, the existing world and championship records were as follows.

The following records were established during the competition:

Results

Heats

Semifinals

Final

Key: WR = World record

References
Worlds 2005 results: Men's 200 m backstroke Heats, from OmegaTiming.com (official timer of the 2005 Worlds); retrieved 2010-01-23.
Worlds 2005 results: Men's 200 m backstroke Semifinals, from OmegaTiming.com (official timer of the 2005 Worlds); retrieved 2010-01-23.
Worlds 2005 results: Men's 200 m backstroke Finals, from OmegaTiming.com (official timer of the 2005 Worlds); retrieved 2010-01-23.

Swimming at the 2005 World Aquatics Championships